{{Infobox television
| image                = The Problem Solverz logotype.svg
| genre                = ComedyMystery
| creator              = Ben Jones
| director             = Ben Jones
| writer               = 
| voices               = 
| narrated             = John DiMaggio
| composer             = Ben Jones
| country              = United States
| language             = English
| num_seasons          = 2
| num_episodes         = 26
| executive_producer   = Ben Jones
| producer             = Nate Funaro
| runtime              = 11 minutes
| company              = {{unbulleted list|Ben Jones Studio, Inc.|Neon Knome pilot:|PFFR Productions|Williams Street|TV series:|Mirari Films|Cartoon Network Studios}}
| distributor          =
Warner Bros. Television Distribution
| channel              = 
| first_aired          = 
| last_aired           = 
}}The Problem Solverz is an American animated television series that aired on Cartoon Network. Created by Ben Jones, it follows Alfe, Roba, and Horace; a group of detectives in their troubled town, Farboro. 

The aforementioned characters were designed while Jones attended college in the 1990s; he later founded the art collective Paper Rad with Jessica and Jacob Ciocci. The characters were featured in Jones' and the collective's animations and comics before the creator pitched a pilot to Adult Swim featuring the trio. The network's executives referred Jones to Cartoon Network, who commissioned a series featuring the same characters. The series was produced in Adobe Flash, with around fifteen animators employed at Cartoon Network Studios and the co-production of Mirari Films.

The Problem Solverz was first aired on April 4, 2011. The first season consisted of eighteen episodes, concluding on September 29, 2011. A second and final season was released exclusively on Netflix in 2013, which is now lost after its removal in 2015. After leaving Cartoon Network, Ben Jones would then work at Fox Television Animation (now called 20th Television Animation) to work on the Fox Saturday Night block Animation Domination High-Def, where he serves as creative director for these shows, as well as creating his own show in Stone Quackers for FXX, and would later work at Bento Box Entertainment, co-creating one of Universal Animation Studios' first adult animated shows Saturday Morning All Star Hits! on Netflix.

Plot

The series follows the eponymous detectives Alfe (Ben Jones), Roba (also Jones), and Horace (Kyle Kaplan). The trio take up solving, and sometimes creating, the numerous problems that plague their town, Farboro. To their aid is Tux Dog (John DiMaggio), an extremely wealthy dog who helps the Solverz in some of their cases but is just as often the source of their problems.

Alfe (pronounced Alfé) is a large, fluffy, fur monster (even though it was suggested that he may be "half-chocolate, half-mutt" in Neon Knome or that he was a man-dog-anteater by creator and voice actor Ben Jones during the 2011 San Diego Comic Con Panel) found and raised by Horace when both were young. He loves devouring large quantities of food, especially pizza and hamburgers, and acts impulsively during missions. Roba, Horace's twin brother and cyborg, is the smartest member of the group, but he suffers from insecurity and anxiety. Horace is the calm and collected leader of the team, usually applying common sense with his detective work and caring after Alfe.

Development

Conception
Growing up in Pittsburgh, creator Ben Jones had an appreciation for comics and animation. His father's Macintosh computer served as a vehicle for Jones to create art and influenced his later visual style. Jones attended the Massachusetts College of Art and Design in the mid-1990s, where he became motivated to launch a project he could adapt to different media. This impetus manifested itself in the characters Alfe, Horace, and Roba. Tux Dog, another principal character, was designed while Jones was in primary school. After his graduation, Jones formed the art collective Paper Rad with Jessica and Jacob Ciocci in 2000. The collective moved that year to Providence, Rhode Island, to participate in the Fort Thunder music venue. After the venue's closure in 2001, Jones released animations on the Web using Adobe Flash, with some featuring Alfe.

Paper Rad later produced animations with the premise of The Problem Solverz but with the three principal characters absent. The collective's 2006 direct-to-DVD release Trash Talking features a segment called "Gone Cabin " in which Alfe, Horace, and Roba appear. In tandem with these experiments, Jones worked as a television animator on Yo Gabba Gabba! and Wonder Showzen. The year of the DVD's release, Jones talked to Nick Weidenfeld, then an executive producer at Adult Swim, about an idea for a series of his own. The result was Neon Knome, a pilot produced by PFFR Productions and Williams Street in 2008, and released on Adult Swim's website two years later as part of a development contest sponsored by Burger King. After deciding the show's aesthetics were not a good fit for Adult Swim, who claimed it looked "too mind-blowingly cute" for their channel, the network's executives later referred Jones to Cartoon Network, believing his creativity would fit better there. Jones agreed to do business with Cartoon Network on the condition that Alfe be a character on The Problem Solverz.

Production

Eric Pringle, a veteran of 2D digital animation, was employed as animation director, providing Jones with much technical assistance. Pringle's colleagues from Foster's Home for Imaginary Friends, another Cartoon Network production, comprised a team of around fifteen full-time animators at the network's studio, all working on Apple computers. Greg Miller was hired as supervising director, Martin Cendreda as technical director, and John Pham with Jon Vermilyea as character designers. Miller is the creator of Whatever Happened to... Robot Jones?, another series on the network. Vermilyea worked also as a character designer on the network's series Adventure Time, while Cendreda, Pham, and Jones all contributed to the anthology comic book Kramers Ergot. Michael Yank was employed as a writer for most episodes, with Mirari Films' CEO Eric Kaplan supervising the creation of scripts.

The series was noted for its visual style employing highly saturated colors and varying shapes. Jones was inspired by the limited-animated series Roger Ramjet and The Rocky and Bullwinkle Show, which he felt employed good character design, cohesiveness, jokes, and timing. He credited The Problem Solverz as the first seamless use of Flash for television animation, with conceptualization and the end result occurring in the same program. Writing was the longest aspect of production, taking up to several months for the crew to conceive the story and draft a script. Animation was comparatively quicker, with the team delivering work in only a few weeks given the digital approach; Jones felt that the animators could play to the strengths of the fully digital animation process.

The show's criticism led to only 26 episodes being produced. 18 of which were produced during the first season in 2011. Towards the end of 2011, eight episodes were produced for the second and final season, and was supposed to air by the end of 2011 or any time in 2012, but due to the show's low ratings, they were only released through Netflix on March 30, 2013.

Voice cast

Main
 Ben Jones – Alfe, Roba
 Kyle Kaplan - Horace
 John DiMaggio – Tux Dog

Recurring

 Pamela Adlon – Mr. Creame, Sweetie Creame, Danny, Danny's Mom
 James Avery – Go-Seeki Ninja Master, Ninja Master's Dad Head
 Eric Bauza – Dork Face, Ale, Alfred
 Matt Berry – Drill Sergeant
 Wayne Brady – Uncle Chocofus
 Tia Carrere – Tara
 Andrew Daly –  Miss May
 Grey DeLisle – Candace, Luka
 John DiMaggio – Narrator (S01 only), Teacher, The Mewmeoh, Badcat (in "Puffy Puppiez"), Jerry, Gary 
 Michael Dorn – Yamir
 Rich Fulcher – Lidget
 Nika Futterman – Stratch
 Mark Hamill – Buddy Huxton, Badcat (in "Badcat")
 Amy Hill – Mrs. Konishi
 Ben Jones – Balloon Professor, Professor Sugarfish, Rusty Pedals 
 Tom Kenny – Bionic Zombies, The Android-geist
 Liz Lee – Additionals (S02E27 only)
 Vanessa Marshall – Emily, Yogi, Trudy H.
 Daran Norris – J.B. McTooth
 Chris Parnell – The Mayor, Eternitron
 Bronson Pinchot – AI (Master Artificial Intelligence)
 Kevin Michael Richardson – Wendigo
 Horatio Sanz – Ralphe
 Paul Scheer – Tony Marv, Fungsten
 Alia Shawkat – Laura
 Kath Soucie – Spiralina
 George Takei – Howard Konishi
 Jill Talley – Nina, Alpha Alien, Dolls' Kid Owner
 Brian Tee – Captain, Granite, Mini Master
 Kari Wahlgren – Katrina Rad
 Jason Walden – Tommy, JZ, Glam Metal Vampirez
 Jaleel White – K-999

Episodes

Series overview

Shorts
The main Problem Solverz characters first appeared in an animated short entitled, "Alfe: Gone Cabin Carzy". The short was created and produced by the art collective Paper Rad, and was written by Ben Jones. This short was included on their DVD Trash Talking, published by Load Records in 2006.

The second Paper Rad animated short, "Problem Solvers", was released on a stand-alone DVD in 2008 as a bonus for the seventh volume of The Ganzfeld, a periodical book series written by Dan Nadel. Although it does not include the main Problem Solverz characters, it introduces the problem solving concept which Jones would use as the basis of his homonymous Cartoon Network series.

Pilot
The pilot episode "Neon Knome" was produced in 2008 by PFFFR and Williams Street for Adult Swim, and then released in 2010 on their official website as part of the "Big, Über, Network, Sampling" programming block.

Season 1 (2011)

Season 2 (2013)
Eight episodes were produced for Season 2 and were originally supposed to air in 2012, but were released through Netflix on March 30, 2013 due to the show's negative critical reception. It never aired on television. This season is now declared lost after Netflix removed the show from the service in 2015 and it’s not available on any digital streaming.

Release
The Problem Solverz was first aired on April 4, 2011, on Cartoon Network. The premiere was seen by 1.1 million viewers, receiving a Nielsen rating of 0.8, in that 0.8 percent of families with a television set viewed the episode on that date. The most-watched episode of the series ("The Mayan Ice Cream Caper") was seen by 1.6 million viewers. Viewership fell with the first episode to have been aired on a Thursday ("Hamburger Cavez"), which was watched by 1.1 million viewers. The first season concluded on September 29, 2011, after eighteen episodes. A second season consisting of eight episodes was released exclusively on Netflix on March 30, 2013.

Reception
The series received mostly negative reviews from critics, but worse reviews from audiences and online viewers. Criticism of The Problem Solverz was directed at the visual style and writing. Rob Owen writing for the Pittsburgh Post-Gazette called the style reminiscent of Atari 5200 video games and wrote that viewers could "thank" or "blame" Jones for his creation. For the magazine Variety, Brian Lowry disregarded the series as uninteresting and challenging to watch, the visuals and sounds weird for weirdness' sake. Emily Ashby of Common Sense Media defined the series as misguided, its stories as undeveloped, and its visual style as unappealing. The Weekly Alibis Devin D. O'Leary acknowledged the style as Paper Rad's own and found the writing more solid than that of Adult Swim's programming for which it could be mistaken. The jokes were not instantly funny according to O'Leary, but the visual style combined with the writing would provide amusement for Paper Rad's existing fans.

Art-related publications, on the other hand, gave praise to Jones' creativity. Dan Nadel, a former publisher of Jones, lauded the series in The Comics Journal for the imagination displayed, "funny and humane and invaluable" at the same time. Paper writer Sammy Harkham called The Problem Solverz "radical" and unlike any other series on television. Geek Exchange writer Liz Ohanesian called the second season more "subdued" than the first, allowing viewers to concentrate on the principal character's relationships. She compared the series to the band Anamanaguchi, in that its unique and polarizing style makes fans of the series hard to find.

See also
 Stone Quackers – another animated series created by Jones following his work on The Problem Solverz
 Saturday Morning All Star Hits! – another animated series created by Jones following his work on the Problem Solverz and Stone Quackers.

References

External links
 

2010s American animated television series
2011 American television series debuts
2013 American television series endings
American children's animated comedy television series
American children's animated mystery television series
American flash animated television series
Cartoon Network original programming
Television series by Cartoon Network Studios
English-language Netflix original programming
Paper Rad
Television series created by Ben Jones